Auchy-lès-Hesdin (literally Auchy near Hesdin) is a commune in the Pas-de-Calais department and Hauts-de-France region of France.

Geography

History
Formerly called Auchy-les-Moines, the village owes its origin to the monastery founded by Saint Sylvain, who came here from Toulouse in 700. Destroyed by the Normans, the monastery was rebuilt in the 11th century by the Counts of Hesdin, and entrusted to the Benedictine monks of St Bertin (see Saint-Omer) in 1072.

Population

Sights

The abbey church
The pillars of the nave and the first span of the choir date back to the middle of the 12th century, the last two sections of the choir around 1200. They are the only remnants of the original church, which had to be almost entirely rebuilt after its collapse in 1280. 
In 1415, several of the knights killed at Agincourt were buried here, including the Admiral of France, Jacques de Châtillon. Two decades later, the constant state of war forced the monks to desert the abbey, where they returned in 1457. Pillaged and burned by troops on several occasions during the 16th century, the buildings of the monastery were restored in the early 17th century. They were used as a textile mill after the Revolution and, with the exception of the abbey church, were finally destroyed by a fire in 1834.

Weir

A large and impressive weir on the river is a tourist attraction.

See also
Communes of the Pas-de-Calais department

References

External links

 Official town website 

Communes of Pas-de-Calais
Artois